Pilocrocis flagellalis is a moth in the family Crambidae. It was described by Paul Dognin in 1909. It is found in French Guiana.

References

Pilocrocis
Moths described in 1909
Moths of South America